The Sharur-Daralayaz uezd was a county (uezd) of the Erivan Governorate of the Caucasus Viceroyalty of the Russian Empire.  It bordered the governorate's Erivan and Nor Bayazet uezds to the north, the Nakhichevan uezd to the south, the Zangezur and Jevanshir uezds of the Elizavetpol Governorate to the east, and Persia to the southwest. It included most of the Vayots Dzor Province of present-day Armenia and the Sharur District of the Nakhchivan exclave of present-day Azerbaijan. The administrative centre of the county was Bashnorashen (present-day Sharur).

Economy 
Armenians were mostly concentrated in mountainous Daralayaz, while lowland Sharur was overwhelmingly Tatar.  The population in Daralayaz was engaged primarily in cattlebreeding while the residents of Sharur were engaged in agricultural farming and gardening. Manufacturing was not developed in this part of the governorate. Only 47 winemaking enterprises, 299 mills, 89 cotton-cleaning, 4 rice-cleaning factories existed in the Sharur-Daralayaz uezd.

Geography
The geography of the uezd resembled a crater surrounded from the south, north and east by tall mountain ranges of the Lesser Caucasus. The plain, which made up a small part of the uezd, was close to the Aras River, into which the only river irrigating the plains, the Arpa-chay, discharged. The mountainous part of the territory was called Daralayaz and the lowland part was called Sharur. Daralayaz constituted approximately 70% of the whole uezd area and Sharur constituted approximately 30%, even though it included about half of the uezd's population. The Arpa-chay started at the southeastern tip of Lake Sevan (Gokcha) and flowed 107 versts before discharging into the Aras. It had many tributaries, the Alagyoz-chay being the longest. Approximately 12,150 desyatins of the mountainous part of uezd was forested.  The temperature in the winter reached -27 °C.

History
The territory of the uezd was part of Persia's Erivan and Nakhchivan Khanates until 1828, when according to the Treaty of Turkmenchay, they were annexed to the Russian Empire. It was administered as part of the Armenian Oblast from 1828 to 1840. In 1844, the Caucasus Viceroyalty was re-established, in which the territory of the Sharur-Daralayaz uezd formed part of the Tiflis Governorate. In 1849, the Erivan Governorate was established, separate from the Tiflis Governorate. It was made up of the Erivan, Nakhchivan, Alexandropol, Nor Bayazet, and Ordubad uezds. Following administrative reforms, the northern part of the Nakhchivan uezd (Daralayaz) was separated to form part of the new Sharur-Daralayaz uezd in 1870. 

Throughout 1918–1920, the uezd was heavily contested between forces of the First Republic of Armenia and Azerbaijan Democratic Republic.

After the establishment of Soviet rule in 1920, the territory of the uezd was divided. Daralayaz (modern-day Vayots Dzor) became part of the Armenian SSR and Sharur became part of the Nakhichevan ASSR of the Azerbaijan SSR in accordance with the treaties of Moscow and Kars.

Administrative divisions 
The subcounties (uchastoks) of the Sharur-Daralayaz uezd in 1913 were as follows:

Demographics

Russian Empire Census 
The plurality of the population indicated Tatar to be their mother tongue, with significant Armenian and Kurdish speaking minorities.

Kavkazskiy kalendar 
According to the 1917 publication of Kavkazskiy kalendar, the Sharur-Daralayaz uezd had a population of 90,250on , including 47,399 men and 42,851 women, 88,496 of whom were the permanent population, and 1,754 were temporary residents. The statistics indicated the uezd to be overwhelmingly Shia Muslim with a significant Armenian minority:

Settlements 
According to the 1897 census, there were 58 settlements in the Sharur-Daralayaz uezd with a population over 500 inhabitants. The religious composition of the settlements was as follows:

Notes

References

Bibliography 

Geographic history of Azerbaijan
Vayots Dzor Province
History of Nakhchivan
Uezds of Erivan Governorate